Lepidobatrachus is a genus of ceratophryidid frogs. They are commonly known as Paraguay horned frogs or Budgett's frogs (in honor of John Samuel Budgett, who described the genus), although the latter technically describes a specific species, Lepidobatrachus laevis.

Geographic range 
Lepidobatrachus are found in South America, in Paraguay, Argentina, Brazil, and Bolivia.

Description 
Lepidobatrachus frogs are generally a light, olive green in color, sometimes with lighter green or yellow mottling. They have a rounded, flattened body with eyes set high on their head. They have short limbs, which make them inefficient swimmers. They do not have teeth, but they do have two sharp protrusions, common to all Ceratophryidae, inside their mouth, which serve the same purpose.

In captivity 
Budgett's frogs are very rarely found in a traditional chain pet shop. The most commonly available species is L. laevis. Due to their comical appearance, they tend to make an attractive option for the intermediate to advanced amphibian keeper. They have an average lifespan of about 10 years.

References

 
Ceratophryidae
Amphibians of South America
Amphibian genera